The 2005 World Aquatics Championships or the XI FINA World Championships were held in Montreal, Quebec, Canada from July 16 to July 31, 2005. They took place in Parc Jean-Drapeau on Saint Helen's Island.

Competition

Medal standings

ordered by gold medals

Diving

Men

Women

Open water swimming

Men

Women

Swimming

Men

Women

Synchronised swimming

Water polo
Men

Women

Bidding for and organizing the event

Montreal became the first city in North America to hold the FINA World Aquatics Championships.

The venue for the games was itself controversial. The games were awarded initially to Montreal, and then taken away again in February 2005 when the city was unable to raise sufficient funding, with other cities indicating their willingness to take the games on. However following promises of funding from various levels of government, Montreal re-bid for the games and they were re-awarded to the city.

On July 16, before the start of the 2005 event, FINA selected the host city for the 2009 World Aquatics Championships — Rome, Italy.

External links
 Official FINA results: Diving ; Swimming ; Open water ; Synchronised swimming ; Water polo 
 Swim Rankings results

 
World Aquatics Championships
Aquatics Championships
Aquatics Championships
FINA World Aquatics Championships
Sports competitions in Montreal
International aquatics competitions hosted by Canada
July 2005 sports events in Canada
2000s in Montreal
2005 in Quebec
Swimming competitions in Canada